Port Vale F.C. is an English professional association football club based in Burslem, Stoke-on-Trent, Staffordshire. The club was formed in the late 1870s and in 1884 they took the name Burslem Port Vale, dropping the 'Burslem' prefix in 1907. The club joined the English Football League in 1892 as founder members of the Football League Second Division and though they resigned in 1907, they continued to play in North Staffordshire district leagues and would return to the Football League in 1919. The club's first team have competed in numerous nationally and internationally organised competitions, and all players who have played at least 25 such matches are listed below.

Introduction
More than 500 Port Vale players have appeared in at least 25 senior competitive matches. In the early days, the scarcity of nationally organised competitive football meant players could spend many years with the club while making few such outings. However to redress this the list includes appearances in minor cup competitions, such as the Staffordshire Senior Cup, prior to World War II. Exhibition matches were the primary source of games in the early days of the game and so appearances in friendly games during 19th century are also included. This means that Frank McGinnes is on the list, who recorded 109 goals in 140 matches despite being limited to just 33 goals in 39 Midland League games due to his death due to kidney failure on 25 June 1892, at the age of 22.

Numerous players throughout the club's history have enjoyed long careers with the club. Roy Sproson made 842 appearances for Vale between 1950 and 1972, later becoming manager for a three-year spell beginning in 1974. His nephew, Phil Sproson, went on to play 500 games for the club between 1977 and 1989. Wilf Kirkham is the club's record goalscorer with 164 goals in all competitions, as well as 38 goals in a season. Gareth Ainsworth is the player Vale have both received and spent the highest sum on in the transfer market, £500,000 spent in 1997 with £2,000,000 received as he exited the following year. Chris Birchall is the club's record international cap holder with 27, playing for Trinidad and Tobago between 2001 and 2006, including three appearances in the 2006 FIFA World Cup. Others made little impact at the club, but were significant figures at other clubs, such as Willie Aitken, who went on to serve as head coach at Juventus.

Key

Players with 25 or more appearances

Players with fewer than 25 appearances

References

Soccerbase
Neil Brown stat site

Port Vale F.C. players
Players
 
Association football player non-biographical articles